The C Line (Green) Extension to Torrance Transit Project is a transit project to extend the Los Angeles County Metropolitan Transportation Authority C Line (formerly known as the Green Line) from its terminus in Redondo Beach to Torrance. It is expected to open for service between 2030 and 2033. The project was known as the South Bay Metro Light Rail Extension in planning.

Overview 
Metro is currently working on the initial environmental study of a corridor extension of the C Line from its Redondo terminus toward the southeast. The extension would roughly follow the Harbor Subdivision right of way into the South Bay, to the proposed Torrance Regional Transit Center (RTC).

A study of the South Bay Extension was necessary to initiate the publication of a Draft Environmental Impact Report (DEIR). The study was expected to be completed in 2011, but the project was placed on hold in the Spring of 2012 due to uncertain funding. With the passage of Measure M in 2016, $619 million was earmarked for the Green Line Extension south and the study resumed. The environmental impact report was scheduled to be released in March 2022, but was ultimately pushed back to fall/winter 2022. Preparing the report led the agency to study further alternatives for grade separations along the two routes. The draft environmental impact report was eventually released in January 2023.

Route selection 
Four potential routes for the extension starting at Redondo Beach station were initially considered. The station in Lawndale was eliminated due to community opposition.

Metro authorized two of four alternatives to move forward: Alternative #1 and Alternative #3. Metro staff recommended the two alternatives into the draft environmental impact statement (DEIR) status for further analysis and refinement in September 2018. The study area includes the former Harbor Subdivisions right of way. The extension study consists of the Redondo Beach station to the Torrance Transit Center, a  extension study area. Metro began composing the DEIR in January 2021 and expects to release it in fall/winter 2022. The first alternative has been expanded into two, differing in whether the alignment is mainly built above grade over the existing ROW or in an open-air trench under the current ROW (with the freight ROW being rebuilt afterward). The route and stations are identical between the two options.

The following table shows all potential Metro stations and the alternatives for which they apply:

According to the LA County Expenditure Plan (Measure M), groundbreaking for the project is scheduled for 2026, with an expected opening in 2030–2033, as of 2022. The timeline is expected to be accelerated under the Twenty-eight by '28 initiative.

References

External links 
 C Line (Green) Extension to Torrance 
 South Bay Metro Light Rail Extension (old Metro page)

2030 in rail transport
Transportation in Los Angeles
Los Angeles County Metropolitan Transportation Authority
Los Angeles Metro Rail projects
Public transportation in Los Angeles
Public transportation in Los Angeles County, California
Proposed railway lines in California